First S. Nijalingappa Ministry was the Council of Ministers in Mysore, a state in South India headed by S. Nijalingappa of the Indian National Congress.

The ministry had multiple  ministers including the Chief Minister. All ministers belonged to the Indian National Congress.

S. Nijalingappa became Chief minister of Mysore after Kadidal Manjappa resigned as Chief Minister of Mysore on 31 October 1956 following Unification of Karnataka.

Chief Minister and cabinet ministers

Minister of State

See also 
 Mysore Legislative Assembly
 Mysore Legislative Council
 Politics of Mysore

References 

Cabinets established in 1956
1956 establishments in Mysore State
1956 in Indian politics
1957 disestablishments in India
Nijalingappa
Indian National Congress state ministries
Cabinets disestablished in 1957